P. Lakshmana Reddy (born 18 April 1945), also spelt P. Lakshman Reddy, is an Indian judge who served as a judge of erstwhile Andhra Pradesh High Court before the bifurcation of Andhra Pradesh and serving as the first Andhra Pradesh Lokayukta post-bifurcation.

References 

Living people
1945 births
20th-century Indian judges
21st-century Indian judges